Lei Fanpei (born May 1963) is a Chinese executive and politician who served as chairman of the board of China Shipbuilding Group from 2018 to 2022. Previously he served as chairman of the board of China Aerospace Science and Technology Corporation.

He was a representative of the 19th National Congress of the Chinese Communist Party. He is a representative of the 20th National Congress of the Chinese Communist Party and a member of the 20th Central Committee of the Chinese Communist Party.

Biography 
Lei was born in Heyang County, Shaanxi, in May 1963. In 1980, he enrolled at Northwestern Polytechnical University where he received his bachelor's degree in 1984 and his master's degree in 1987 both in rocket engine. He joined the Chinese Communist Party (CCP) in January 1985.

After University in April 1987, he was assigned to the 067 Base of Ministry of Aerospace Industry (now China Academy of Aerospace Propulsion Technology, also known as the 6th Research Institute of China Aerospace Science and Technology Corporation), where he eventually becoming deputy director and than director in 1997. In February 2005, he became deputy general manager of the China Aerospace Science and Technology Corporation, rising to general manager in April 2013. He rose to become chairman of the board in May 2014.

He was appointed chairman of the board of China State Shipbuilding Corporation in March 2018, concurrently serving as party branch secretary.

References 

1963 births
Living people
People from Weinan
Northwestern Polytechnical University alumni
People's Republic of China politicians from Shaanxi
Chinese Communist Party politicians from Shaanxi
Members of the 20th Central Committee of the Chinese Communist Party